Leeland/Third Ward is a light rail station in Houston, Texas, on the METRORail system. It is served by the Purple Line and is located on Scott Street at Leeland Street in East Downtown, across Interstate 45 from the Third Ward.

Leeland/Third Ward station opened on May 23, 2015.

References

METRORail stations
Railway stations in the United States opened in 2015
2015 establishments in Texas
Third Ward, Houston
Railway stations in Harris County, Texas